Dearman is a surname. Notable people with the surname include:

Glyn Dearman (1939–1997), former child actor whose acting career spanned almost two decades
James Dearman (1808–1854), English professional cricketer
John Dearman, Grammy Award-winning classical guitarist
Louise Dearman, British musical theatre performer